Julian Knowle and Michael Kohlmann were the defending champions but lost in the final 7–5, 5–7, 6–2 against Tomáš Cibulec and Pavel Vízner.

Seeds

  Tomáš Cibulec /  Pavel Vízner (champions)
  Paul Hanley /  Nathan Healey (quarterfinals)
  Simon Aspelin /  Ota Fukárek (first round)
  Julian Knowle /  Michael Kohlmann (final)

Draw

External links
 2003 Copenhagen Open Doubles draw

2003 Copenhagen Open – 2
2003 ATP Tour